This article describes the phonology of the Somali language.

Consonants
Common Somali has 23 consonant phonemes. Its consonants cover every place of articulation on the IPA chart, though not all of these distinctions are phonemic.

/b/ is often realized as [β] when in a stressed intervocalic position.

The voiced affricate  is missing in many northern and eastern dialects, with the voiceless affricate  taking its place.

 is a voiced retroflex stop. Some phoneticians say that it has an implosive quality for some speakers. It is sometimes realised as a flap  between vowels.

, the voiced pharyngeal fricative, may have creaky voice.

 is often pronounced with breathy voice and may be partially devoiced. Between vowels it may be a single tap.

/q/ is sometimes epiglottalized.

Vowels

Somali has five vowel articulations that all contrast murmured and harsh voice as well as vowel length. There is little change in vowel quality when the vowel is lengthened. Each vowel has a harmonic counterpart, and every vowel within a harmonic group (which notably can be larger than a word in Somali) must harmonize with the other vowels. The Somali orthography, however, does not distinguish between the two harmonic variants of each vowel.

Tone
Lexical prominence in Somali can be classified under a pitch accent system, in which there is one high-tone mora per word.

The tone system distinguishes both grammatical and lexical differences. Differences include numbers singular and plural (a grammatical distinction), and masculine and feminine genders (a grammatical and sometimes also lexical distinction). One example is inán ('girl') versus ínan ('boy'). This reflects a tonal pattern that codes grammatical gender, such as dameér ('female donkey') versus daméer ('male donkey').

The question of the tone system in Somali has been debated for decades. The modern consensus is as follows.

In Somali, the tone-bearing unit is the mora rather than the vowel of the syllable. A long vowel or a diphthong consists of two morae and can bear two tones. Each mora is defined as being of high or low tone. Only one high tone occurs per word and this must be on the final or penultimate mora. Particles do not have a high tone. (These include prepositions, clitic pronouns for subject and object, impersonal subject pronouns and focus markers.) There are therefore three possible "accentual patterns" in word roots.

Phonetically there are three tones on long vowels: high, low and falling:
 On a long vowel or diphthong, a sequence of high-low is realised as a falling tone.
 On a long vowel or diphthong, a sequence of low-high is realised as high-high. (Occasionally, it is a rising tone.)

This use of tone may be characterized as pitch accent. It is similar to that in Oromo.

Stress is connected with tone. The high tone has strong stress; the falling tone has less stress and the low tone has no stress.

When needed, the conventions for marking tone on written Somali are as follows:
 acute accent - high tone
 grave accent - low tone
 circumflex - falling tone

Tones on long vowels are marked on the first vowel symbol.

Phonotactics
The syllable structure of Somali is (C)V(C).

Root morphemes usually have a mono- or di-syllabic structure.

Clusters of two consonants do not occur word-initially or word-finally, i.e., they only occur at syllable boundaries. The following cannot be geminate: ,  and the fricatives.

Two vowels cannot occur together at syllable boundaries.

Phonological processes

Allophones

 The voiced stops (and ) are devoiced in word-initial and word-final position. Between two vowels they become fricatives.
 All vowels are nasalised before or after a nasal consonant.

Epenthesis
When a vowel occurs in word-initial position, a glottal stop is inserted before it.

Sandhi
Phonological changes occur at morpheme boundaries (sandhi) for specific grammatical morphemes. There may be assimilation or elision.

Coalescence also occurs.  This is a kind of external sandhi in which words join, undergoing phonological processes such as elision. In Somali it is sometimes obligatory and sometimes it is dependent on the speech style.

Vowel harmony
Roots have front-back vowel harmony. There is also a process of vowel harmony in strings longer than a word, known as "harmonic groups".

Prosody
Intonation (as opposed to tone, see above) does not carry grammatical information although it may convey the speaker's attitude or emotion.

References

Bibliography

 
 
 

Somali language
Afroasiatic phonologies